The Mercantile Movements Division  originally known as the Convoy Section  was a former Directorate of the  British Admiralty, Naval Staff that coordinated, organised and plotted all Merchant Navy convoys, routing and schedules from 1917 until 1920.

History
Responsibility for the convoy system was administered by the Admiralty as early as 1914. A specific Convoy Section  of the Naval Staff was originally established 25 June 1917 as part of the Anti-Submarine Division with the appointment of an Organizing Manager of Convoys the Convoy Section coordinated with the Ministry of Shipping who was responsible for Merchant Shipping and the Naval Intelligence Division to organise all convoy, routings and schedules. Although planning of routes for all convoys including there escorting vessels was usually supervised by the Assistant Chief of the Naval Staff as he was responsible for trade protection and anti-submarine operations.

In September 1917 the Admiralty dually became responsible for the control of the ships of the British Merchant Navy together with the movements of the British Fleet. It established the Mercantile Movements Division under the control of a Director of Mercantile Movements  to administer this arrangement. However, in the case of convoys a different system had to be devised, This was owing to the difficulty of transmitting information and the problems it caused unless complete control over any convoy when it was finally at sea had to come under jurisdiction of the Admiralty  when this was agreed to the movements of convoys for the majority of there journey would then be directed by the Mercantile Movements Division and convoys were usually “plotted” from day to day.

In order to avert as many problems as possible certain alternative measures were adopted, for example convoys when travelling at night without lights had to be diverted of one another. In order to achieve this use of wireless telegraphy was employed to transmit course changes to convoys, particularly if they came within close 'proximity' of each other. They were also directed to avoid certain areas where it was known German U-boat's were operating. Other measures put in place involved altering agreed destination of some ships as they approached home waters.

As convoys approached from the North East Atlantic and U.K. home waters, usually being the Celtic, Irish, North Sea's and English Channel, they would then be within the strategic responsibility of the Commanders-in-Chief of the Coast of Ireland, Devonport, Portsmouth, and the Commander of the Dover Patrol, at that point they were taken in charge by one or other of them. Port staff would keep a record of all movements of ships passing through or working within in each Command, this enabled area Commander-in-Chief to action operational requirements where they deemed necessary. During the interwar years the division was disbanded as a distinct entity and its previous functions were amalgamated within the Tactical Division. In 1939 at the beginning of World War II the Trade Division assumed overall responsibility for planning, control and protection of all British merchant shipping from the Tactical Division until 1945.

Directors duties
 Control all assembly points of all convoys and vessels. 
 Ensure cooperation between the loading and discharging of cargoes and convoy requirements.
 Intercommunicate with the Director of Anti-Submarine Division
 Liaise with the Ministry of Shipping.  
 Mediate with the Director of Naval Intelligence Division.
 Synchronize shipping needs with convoy needs.

Heads of section/division
Included:

Organising Manager of Convoys
 Mr. H. W. Eldon Manisty, 25 June 1917 - 10 September 1917

Directors of Mercantile Movements
 Captain Frederic A. Whitehead, 10 September 1917 – 19 January 1919 
 Captain Bertram H. Smith, 19 January 1919 – 30 September 1919

Structure of Division
As of 1917

 Office of the Director of Mercantile Movements............Office of the Secretary to the Director of Mercantile Movements and Division Staff Paymaster.
 Casualty Section.....Chart Room.....General Staff Section
 Routeing Section.....Tug Section.....Home Section
 Office of the Deputy Director of Mercantile Movements
 Convoy Section
 Convoy 3 (Japan)
 Convoy 4 (Japan)
 Convoy 5 (Japan)
 Convoy 6 (Japan)
 Convoy 7 (Japan)
 Convoy 8 (Japan)
 Convoy 9 (Japan)
 Convoy 10 (Japan)
 Convoy 1 (USA)
 Convoy 13 (USA)
 Convoy 14 (USA)
 Convoy 16 (USA)
 Convoy 17 (USA)
 Office of the Fleet Pay Master & Organising Manager of Convoy
Inbound Ports of Assembly
 Gibraltar 
 Freetown, Sierra Leone
 Dakar, Senegal
 Hampton Roads (U.S.A.)  
 New York, (U.S.A.)  
 Halifax, Nova Scotia  
 Sydney, Cape Breton, Nova Scotia
 Yokohama, Japan
Outbound Ports of Assembly
 Lamlash, Scotland
 Milford Haven, England
 Queenstown, Ireland
 Falmouth, England
 Plymouth, England

 Note Each inbound port served a certain area of trade, and vessels engaged in that trade met at the port of assembly for convoy to the United Kingdom or to France.

Timeline
 Board of Admiralty, Admiralty Naval Staff, Anti-Submarine Division, (1914-1917). (established convoy section)
 Board of Admiralty, Admiralty Naval Staff, Mercantile Movements Division, (1917-1920).
 Board of Admiralty, Admiralty Naval Staff, Tactical Division, (1921-1939) - (responsible for convoy movements).
 Board of Admiralty, Admiralty Naval Staff, Trade Division, (1939-1945) - (responsible for convoys).

References

Sources
  Black, Nicholas. "‘The Admiralty War Staff and its influence on the conduct of the naval between 1914 and 1918.’" (PDF). discovery.ucl.ac.uk. University College London, 2006. 
 Black, Nicholas (2009). The British Naval Staff in the First World War. Boydell Press. .
 Hunt, Barry D. (2006). Sailor-Scholar: Admiral Sir Herbert Richmond 1871-1946. Wilfrid Laurier Univ. .
 Jellicoe, John Rushworth, Admiral of the Fleet (1920). "The crisis of the naval war". London: Cassell and Company, Ltd.

Further reading
 Rodger N.A.M. (1979), The Admiralty, Offices of State, Terrance Dalton Ltd, Lavenham, England.

External links

Admiralty departments
Admiralty during World War I
1917 establishments in the United Kingdom
1920 disestablishments in the United Kingdom